Chain Letter is a 2010 American slasher film directed by Deon Taylor. It was written by Diana Erwin, Michael J. Pagan, and Deon Taylor. The film is about six friends who are stalked by a murderer that uses chains to kill them if they do not pass on the chain letter to five other people.

Plot
The film opens in a garage with an unconscious teenage girl having her head wrapped in duct tape and her legs chained to the back of two cars. A man and woman walk to their cars on their way to work. As the couple start their cars they exit the driveway. The woman in the car notices the victim, but before she can warn the man, he drives off.

Neil Conners (Cody Kasch) receives a chain letter from an anonymous person telling him that he is the first person who links the chain, and it instructs him to forward it to five people or else he will die. His sister Rachael (Cherilyn Wilson) forwards the letter, but to only four recipients. Neil then adds his sister to the list and sends it.

Rachael's best friend, Jessica "Jessie" Campbell (Nikki Reed), receives the letter and forwards it to five friends. Johnny Jones (Matt Cohen) also receives it but refuses to send it, believing it to be ridiculous. While he is getting a drink of water at the fountain in the gym, a black-hooded figure slams his head on the fountain, knocking two of his teeth out. Unconscious, he is chained by his arms to a gym set and his ankles are sliced open. The killer then uses the chains to slice his face open, killing him. Jessie becomes suspicious as more people start to die.

While taking a bath, Rachael becomes suspicious of a possible intruder inside the house. She investigates and is attacked by the killer who whips her with a chain several times as she runs through the house to escape. Re-entering the bathroom, she locks the door and looks for a weapon, pacing back and forth with a cistern lid, waiting for him to attack. She walks up to the door and places her face next to it, listening. Suddenly realizing the killer is on the other side doing exactly the same thing, she backs away. A few second later, the killer breaks through a side wall into the bathroom, hitting her on the top of her head with the lid, splitting it open.

Outside the house, Jessie is greeted by Detective Jim Crenshaw (Keith David), who tells her to forward the chain letter on to him. Jessie figures out they are being spied on using a virus embedded in the chain letter so she informs Neil and Michael (Michael J. Pagan); she tells them to get new e-mail addresses and phone numbers, as she believes this will stop the killings. Later on, as more people send Neil the message, he panics and decides to delete all of them in order to confront the killer. The killer, however, is on the roof of Neil's room, and sends a chain smashing through his ceiling. Neil dies when he is dragged up to the roof of his house by a chain with various sickles and a hook.

The next day, it is revealed that the teen girl chained to the cars in the beginning of the film is Jessie, who is killed because she sent the chain letter to Detective Crenshaw without sending it to four other people. Michael tries to save her but is too late; when her father pulls out of the driveway, Jessie is ripped apart.

As the film ends, Detective Crenshaw is shown chained to a table while the killer makes chains.

Cast

 Nikki Reed as Jessica "Jessie" Campbell
 Keith David as Detective Jim Crenshaw
 Brad Dourif as Mr. Smirker
 Betsy Russell as Sergeant Hamill
 Cody Kasch as Neil Conners
 Cherilyn Wilson as Rachael Conners
 Michael J. Pagan as Michael Grant
 Noah Segan as Dante
 David Zahedian as Brad
 Matt Cohen as Johnny Jones
 Patrick St. Esprit as Dean Jones
 Kate Enggren as Debra Jones
 Terrence Evans as Mr. Bradford
 Madison Bauer as Jane Campbell
 Phil Austin as Phillip Campbell
 Brian Tee as Brian Yee
 Charles Fleischer as Frank Wiggins
 Shari Carlson as Judy Connors
 Deborah Geffner as Irene Cristoff
 Bai Ling as Jai Pham
 Jonathan Hernandez as Carlos
 Lyn Ross as Shirley
 Johann Tate as Burt
 Joel Shnowski as Freeman
 Richard Moorhouse as Uncle Bob
 Khatira Rafiqzada as Miss Garrett
 Michael Bailey Smith as Chain Man

Release
Chain Letter would undergo numerous delays before the film's official premiere, with several announced release dates that were later cancelled.
On November 8, 2009 it was announced that New Films International had bought rights to distribute Chain Letter worldwide, with the intention of developing it into a potential franchise. It was also reported that New Films intended to give the film a theatrical release in the United States the following year. The film was originally set to be released theatrically on May 21, 2010, however, it was later announced that the film would receive a limited theatrical release in six major cities in the United States on August 6, 2010.  intended release was once again later pushed back to an undetermined date. The film would eventually premiere in a limited number of theaters on October 1, 2010. It would become one of several horror films at the time that would under-perform at the box office, grossing $138,788 in the United States on opening day, averaging $342 in 406 theaters. It would finish out its theatrical run on October 7, with $205,842 in the United States and $816,611 internationally, with a worldwide total of $1,022,453, on a $3 million budget, making it a box office bomb.

Home media
The film was released in both unrated and theatrical cuts on DVD and Blu-ray on February 1, 2011.

Reception
Chain Letter received mostly negative reviews from critics. On review aggregator website Rotten Tomatoes, the film has an approval rating of 29% based on 14 reviews, with an average rating of 2.1/10.

Mike Hale from The New York Times panned the film stating, "Chain Letter is bad in depressing and irritating ways, from the incoherent story to the unimaginative brutality of the killings to the especially cynical, sequel-baiting ending". Frank Scheck from The Hollywood Reporter called the film "a by-the-numbers example of torture porn". Diego Semerene from Slant Magazine awarded the film one and a half out of a possible four stars, highlighting the film's "hackneyed" anti-technology message, formulaic screenplay, and bland characters. IGNs R.L. Shaffer felt the film "could have been a pretty effective little chiller", but ended up being a bland, and failed attempt to cash in on the Scream knock-off trend; with well-executed gore effects undermined by poor pacing, direction, editing, and a plot stocked with one dimensional characters and cheap scares.

Alternately, some reviewers were more favorable of the film. Heather Wixson of Dread Central awarded the film a score of three and a half out of five. Wixson commended the film for its direction, and special effects, while also noting the unnecessary subplot, and minor technical errors, Dennis Harvey from Variety felt the film's themes on technology felt way too dated, also criticizing the film's "sloppy" screenplay, poor resolution and unmemorable deaths. However, Harvey went on to note that the film's film's slick direction and plot twists worked well enough to ensure that it was reasonably successful.

References

Further reading
 ‘Chain Letter’ Passed Onto DVD/Blu-ray February 1 - Bloody Disgusting
 Betsy Russell Talks Saw 3D and Chain Letter! [Exclusive] - MovieWeb

External links
 
 
 
 
 
 
 

2010 films
2010 horror films
2010 horror thriller films
2010s serial killer films
American horror thriller films
American slasher films
Films based on urban legends
Films directed by Deon Taylor
Films shot in California
2010s English-language films
2010s American films